Andrea Gulli (born 9 November 1997) is an Italian footballer who plays as a defender for Serie D club SC Ligorna 1922.

Club career
Gulli started his career in Genoa. In the summer of 2016, he was loaned to Lega Pro side Santarcangelo. He made his professional debut in the first round of the 2016–17 season, coming on as a substitute in the 83rd minute for Francesco Posocco in the 3–1 home won against FeralpiSalò. He played only 13 matches, then Genoa loaned him Serie D side Albissola to the 2017–18 season in the summer of 2017. The team was promoted to Serie C, and made Gulli's signing permanent in the summer of 2018.

References

Sources
 
 

1997 births
Living people
People from Savona
Footballers from Liguria
Association football defenders
Italian footballers
Serie C players
Serie D players
Genoa C.F.C. players
Santarcangelo Calcio players
Albissola 2010 players
Sportspeople from the Province of Savona